The 2016 Africa Continental Team Badminton Championships were held in Beau-Bassin Rose-Hill, Mauritius, between 15–21 February and were organised by Badminton Confederation of Africa. South Africa was the defending champion. This tournament serves as qualification stage for African countries for the 2016 Thomas & Uber Cup.

Medalists

Men's Team

Women's Team

Men's team

Group stage

Group A

South Africa vs. Reunion

Mauritius vs. Zimbabwe

Mauritius vs. Reunion

South Africa vs. Zimbabwe

South Africa vs. Mauritius

Zimbabwe vs. Reunion

Group B

Algeria vs. Ghana

Uganda vs. Ghana

Algeria vs. Uganda

Knockout stage

Semifinals
South Africa vs. Ghana

Mauritius vs. Algeria

Final
South Africa vs. Mauritius

Women's team

Group stage

Group A

Egypt vs. Reunion

Uganda vs. Reunion

Egypt vs. Uganda

Group B

Mauritius vs. Zimbabwe

Ghana vs. Zimbabwe

Mauritius vs. Ghana

Knockout stage

Semifinals
Egypt vs. Ghana

Uganda vs. Mauritius

Final
Egypt vs. Mauritius

References

External links
Badminton World Federation - Draws

Africa Continental Team Badminton Championships
Africa Continental Team Badminton Championships
Badminton tournaments in Mauritius
February 2016 sports events in Africa